Kosmos 472 ( meaning Cosmos 472), known before launch as DS-P1-Yu No.52, was a Soviet satellite which was launched in 1972 as part of the Dnepropetrovsk Sputnik programme. It was a  spacecraft, which was built by the Yuzhnoye Design Bureau, and was used as a radar calibration target for anti-ballistic missile tests.

Launch 
Kosmos 472 was successfully launched into low Earth orbit on 25 January 1972, with the rocket lifting off at 11:15:01 UTC. The launch took place from Site 133/1 at the Plesetsk Cosmodrome, and used a Kosmos-2I 63SM carrier rocket.

Orbit 
Upon reaching orbit, it was assigned its Kosmos designation, and received the International Designator 1972-004A. The North American Aerospace Defense Command assigned it the catalogue number 05804.

Kosmos 472 was the fiftieth of seventy nine DS-P1-Yu satellites to be launched, and the forty-fifth of seventy two to successfully reach orbit. It remained in orbit until it decayed and reentered the atmosphere on 18 August 1972.

See also

 1972 in spaceflight

References

1972 in spaceflight
Kosmos satellites
Spacecraft launched in 1972
Spacecraft which reentered in 1972
Dnepropetrovsk Sputnik program